Fernanda Contreras and Marcela Zacarías were the defending champions but chose not to participate.

Carolyn Ansari and Ariana Arseneault won the title, defeating Reese Brantmeier and Elvina Kalieva in the final, 7–5, 6–1.

Seeds

Draw

Draw

References
Main Draw

Pelham Racquet Club Pro Classic - Doubles